The Brierley Hill by-election of 29 April 1967 was held after the death of Conservative MP (MP) John Ellis Talbot:

The seat was marginal, having been won by Labour during 1950 United Kingdom general election by 4,637 votes, and the Conservatives in the preceding 1966 United Kingdom general election by only 1,567.

Candidates
Fergus Montgomery for the Conservatives, was a teacher and councillor in Hebburn prior to becoming Member of Parliament for Newcastle East
Derek Forwood was the Labour candidate. He told the Guardian newspaper in 2005 an anecdote from the Brierley Hill by-election at which then foreign secretary George Brown was subject to heckling at a hustings event. When he addressed the crowd and spoke of morality, a woman shouted out, "Hey, George, what do know about morality?" to which he shot back: "Come outside, love, and I'll show you!" 
Liberal candidate Michael Steed was lecturer in Government at Manchester University at the time of the election. His election addresses included calls to join the EEC and end the VietNam war
Writer John Creasey nominated himself as candidate for the All Party Alliance he had created.

Result of the previous general election

Result of the by-election

References

1967 elections in the United Kingdom
1967 in England
By-election, 1967
By-elections to the Parliament of the United Kingdom in West Midlands (county) constituencies
20th century in Staffordshire
April 1967 events in the United Kingdom